Matheus Planelles Donelli (born 17 May 2002) is a Brazilian professional footballer who plays as a goalkeeper for Corinthians.

Career statistics

Club

Honours

Brazil U17
 FIFA U-17 World Cup: 2019

Individual
 FIFA U-17 World Cup Golden Glove: 2019

References

External links
Corinthians profile 

2002 births
Living people
Footballers from São Paulo
Brazilian footballers
Brazil youth international footballers
Association football goalkeepers
Sport Club Corinthians Paulista players